Henry Poole & Co is a bespoke tailor located at Savile Row in London. The company made the first modern-style dinner jacket based on specifications provided by the Prince of Wales (later Edward VII) in the 1880s.

History

The business first opened in Brunswick Square, in 1806, originally specializing in military tailoring, with particular merit at the time of the Battle of Waterloo. The business moved to Savile Row in 1846, following the death of founder James Poole. Henry Poole ran the business until his death in 1876, and was succeeded by cousin Samuel Cundey, whose legacy continued for five generations to the present-day owners Angus Cundey and son Simon.

The company still holds many royal warrants of appointment and services the Lord Chamberlain's office with court dress, with their livery department even creating uniforms for the 200th anniversary of the Battle of Trafalgar. The company is also known for the creation of the dinner suit. In 2006, the company celebrated their bicentennial with a refurbishment of their premises, and 2007 saw a re-issue of a suiting material made famous by Winston Churchill, a Henry Poole customer who ordered his first suit 100 years prior.

The Dinner Suit
In 1860, Henry Poole made a short evening or smoking jacket for the Prince of Wales to wear at informal dinner parties at Sandringham. In 1886, Mr. James Potter of Tuxedo Park, New York, visited London and subsequently was invited by the Prince to spend a weekend at Sandringham House. He was also advised that he could have a smoking jacket made by the Prince’s tailors, Henry Poole & Co.

When the Potters returned to New York, Mr. Potter proudly wore his new smoking jacket at the Tuxedo Club and fellow members soon started having copies made for themselves which they adopted as their informal uniform for club "stag" dinners. As a result, the dinner jacket became known as a tuxedo or tux in America.

Warrants
Henry Poole has had customers who belonged to royalty and the highest aristocracy. Amongst the many customers who issued official warrants or were regulars were: 

 Emperor Napoleon III 1858
 The Prince of Wales 1863
 The Duke of Edinburgh 1868
 The Crown Prince of Prussia 1868
 Queen Victoria 1869
 The King of the Belgians 1869
 The Crown Prince of Denmark 1869
 The Prince of Teck 1870
 Prince Christian of Schleswig-Holstein 1870
 The Khedive of Egypt 1870
 Prince Oscar of Sweden & Norway 1871
 King Amadeus I of Spain 1871
 Prince Louis of Hesse 1871
 Crown Prince of Russia 1874
 The Emperor Pedro II of Brazil 1874
 Tsar Alexander II of Russia 1875
 The King of Hellenes 1877
 The Crown Prince of Austria 1878
 King Umberto I of Italy 1879
 Emperor Wilhelm I of Germany
 Tsar Alexander III of Russia 1881
 King David Kalakaua of Hawai'i 1882
 The Duke of Genoa 1891
 Friedrich, Grossherzog of Baden 1891
 The Duke of Aosta 1892
 Prince Emanuel of Savoie 1892
 The Shah of Persia
 The King of Denmark 1893
 King Edward VII 1902
 Prince Albrecht of Prussia 1903
 The Maharajah Gaekwar of Baroda 1905
 The Shah of Persia 1906
 The Khedive of Egypt 1910
 Queen Alexandra 1911
 The Prince of Wales 1922
 The Imperial Household of Japan 1923
 King George V 1928
 The King of the Bulgarians 1936
 King George VI 1940
 Emperor Haile Selassie 1959
 Queen Elizabeth II 1976

See also
 Savile Row tailoring

References

Further reading
 Stephen Howarth: Henry Poole: Founders of Savile Row - The Making of a Legend. Godalming: Bene Factum, 2003.

External links

Company website
Historical background information

Clothing brands of the United Kingdom
Clothing companies of England
Clothing retailers of England
British suit makers
High fashion brands
Savile Row Bespoke Association members
Shops in London
Buildings and structures in the City of Westminster
Clothing companies based in London
British companies established in 1806
Retail companies established in 1806
1806 establishments in England
British Royal Warrant holders